Fernão Pires is a white Portuguese wine grape grown throughout Portugal, especially in the Tejo and Bairrada, where it is also known as "Maria Gomes".  This variety is known to produce wines with a spicy aromatic character, though often with delicate exotic fruity notes.  Generally not expected to be a long-living wine, this wine is best drunk in its infancy or matured for up to 2 or 3 years. Outside of Portugal there are some significant plantings in South Africa.

Synonyms
Fernão Pires is also known under the synonyms Camarate, Fernam Pires, Fernan Piriz, Fernão Pirão, Fernao Pires, Fernão Pires do Beco, Gaeiro, Gaieiro, Maria Gomes, and Molinha.

See also
List of Portuguese grape varieties

References

White wine grape varieties